Leandro Salvagno Rattaro (born March 3, 1984, in Colonia del Sacramento) is a Uruguayan rower, who won silver for the quadruple sculls at the 2003 Pan American Games in Santo Domingo, Dominican Republic, and a bronze at the 2006 South American Games in Buenos Aires, Argentina. He made his official debut at the 2004 Summer Olympics in Athens, where he finished second for the D-final, and twentieth overall in the men's single sculls, with a fastest possible time of 7:01.33.

At the 2008 Summer Olympics in Beijing, Salvagno won the D-final of the men's single sculls, finishing ahead of Hong Kong's Law Hiu Fung by two seconds, with a time of 7:04.13. He only placed nineteenth out of thirty-two rowers in the overall rankings.

Salvagno, however, felt short in his bid to qualify for the 2012 Summer Olympics in London, after competing in the single sculls at the Latin America Continental Qualification Regatta in Buenos Aires. He finished abruptly in sixth place for the semi-final rounds, with a slowest possible time of 8:44.30.

References

External links

NBC 2008 Olympics profile

Uruguayan male rowers
Living people
Olympic rowers of Uruguay
Rowers at the 2004 Summer Olympics
Rowers at the 2008 Summer Olympics
People from Colonia del Sacramento
1984 births
Rowers at the 2011 Pan American Games
Pan American Games silver medalists for Uruguay
Pan American Games medalists in rowing
South American Games bronze medalists for Uruguay
South American Games medalists in rowing
Competitors at the 2006 South American Games
Medalists at the 2003 Pan American Games
Medalists at the 2019 Pan American Games
21st-century Uruguayan people